František is a masculine given name of Czech origin. It is a cognate of Francis, Francisco, François, and Franz. People with the name include:

Frank Daniel (František Daniel) (1926–1996), Czech film director, producer, and screenwriter
Frank Musil (František Musil) (born 1964), Czech professional ice hockey player and coach
František Albert (1856–1923), Czech surgeon and writer
František Balvín (born 1915), Czech Olympic cross-country skier
František Bartoš (disambiguation), multiple people
František Bartoš (folklorist) (1837–1906), Moravian ethnomusicologist and folklorist
František Bartoš (motorcycle racer) (born 1926), Czech Grand Prix motorcycle road racer
František Běhounek (1898–1973), Czech scientist, explorer, and writer
František Bělský (1921–2000), Czech sculptor
František Bílek (1872–1941), Czech Art Nouveau and Symbolist sculptor and architect
František Bolček (1920–1968), Slovak professional football player
František Brikcius (contemporary), Czech cellist
František Brixi (a.k.a. Franz Brixi) (1732–1771), Czech composer of the Baroque period
František Brůna (born 1944), Czech Olympic handball player
František Brzák (1915–2006), Czech Olympic canoeist
František Bublan (born 1951), Czech government minister and former dissident
František Čáp (1913–1972), Czech film director and screenwriter
František Čapek (1914–2008), Czech Olympic sprint canoeist
František Čelakovský (a.k.a. Marcian Hromotluk) (1799–1852), Czech writer and translator
František Čermák (born 1976), Czech professional tennis player
František Čermák (painter) (1822–84), Czech painter

František Čermák (sport shooter) (1894–?), Czech sports shooter
František Černík (born 1953), Czech professional ice hockey player; playing in the United States
František Chvalkovský (1885–1945), Czech diplomat; fourth foreign minister of Czechoslovakia
František Chvostek (1835–1884), Moravian physician
František Cipro (born 1947), Czech professional football player and manager
František Doležal (born 1913), Czech Olympic boxer
František Donth (fl. 1920s), Czech Olympic Nordic skier
František Doucha (1810–1884), Czech literary translator and writer
František Douda (1908–1990), Czech Olympic shot putter
František Drdla (1868–1944), Czech concert violinist and composer
František Dřížďal (born 1978), Czech professional football player
František Drtikol (1883–1961), Czech photographer
František Dvořák (disambiguation), multiple people
František Dvorník (1893–1975), Czech historian
František Fadrhonc (1914–1981), Czech professional football manager for the Netherlands
František Fajtl (1912–2006), Czech fighter pilot of World War II; served with the RAF
František Flos (1864–1961), Czech novelist
František Fuka (born 1968), Czech musician, computer programmer, and blogger
František Gellner (1881–disappeared 1914), Czech poet, writer, artist, and anarchist
František Getreuer (1906–1945), Czech swimmer and Olympic water polo player, killed in Dachau concentration camp
František Graus (1921–1989), Czech historian of medieval Europe
František Häckel (fl. 1920s), Czech cross-country skier
František Halas (1901–1949), Czech lyric poet, essayist, and translator
František Havelka (1908–unknown), Czech Olympic boxer
František Hoholko (1947–2005), Slovak professional football player and coach
František Hrabě (fl. 1950s), Czech slalom canoeist
František Hrubín (1910–1971), Czech poet and writer
František Huf (born 1981), Czech bodybuilder
František Jakub Prokyš (1713–1791), Bohemian Rococo painter
František Jakubec (born 1956), Czech professional football player
František Janák (born 1951), Czech glass artist
František Janda-Suk (1878–1955), Czech Olympic athlete
František Jež (born 1970), Czech Olympic ski jumper and Nordic skier
František Jílek (1913–1993), Czech orchestra conductor
František Josef Gerstner (1756–1832), Bohemian physicist and engineer
František Josef Studnička (1836–1903), Czech mathematician and university professor
František Junek (1907–1970), Czech professional football player
František Kaberle, Sr. (born 1951), Czech professional football player
František Kaberle (born 1973), Czech professional ice hockey player
František Kadaňka (born 1944), Czech slalom canoeist
František Kašický (born 1968), Slovak politician and government minister
František Kaván (1866–1941), Czech painter and poet
František Klácel (1808–1882), Moravian Augustinian author, philosopher, and scientist
František Kloz (1905–1945), Czech professional football player; killed in World War II
František Kmoch (1848–1912), Czech composer and orchestra conductor
František Knapík (born 1956), Slovak politician, mayor of the Slovak  city of Košice
František Koláček (1851–1913), Czech physicist
František Komňacký (born 1951), Czech professional football coach
Frantisek Kotzwara (1730–1791), Czech violist, double bassist, and composer
František Králík (1942–1974), Czech Olympic handball player
František Kriegel (1908–1979), Czechoslovak politician and physician; kidnapped to Moscow during the Warsaw Pact invasion in 1968
František Křižík (1847–1941), Czech inventor, electrical engineer, and entrepreneur
František Kučera (born 1968), Czech professional ice hockey player
František Kupka (1871–1957), Czech painter and graphic artist
František Ladislav Rieger (1818–1903), Czech politician and publicist of the early Czech nationalist movement
František Lanák (20th century), Slovak professional football manager
František Langer (1888–1965), Czech playwright, military physician, script writer, and essayist
František Laurinec (born 1951), Slovak Football Association president
František Lexa (1876–1960), Czechoslovak Egyptologist
František Lipka (born 1946), Slovak diplomat, poet, and translator
František Listopad (born 1921), Czech poet, prose writer, essayist, and theatre and television director
František Lorenz (a.k.a. Francisco Valdomiro Lorenz) (1872–1957), Czech polyglot, philosopher, and Esperantist
František Lydie Gahura (1891–1958), Czech architect and sculptor
František Maka (born 1968), Czech Olympic Nordic skier
František Mareš (1857–1942), Czechoslovak professor of physiology and philosophy; nationalist politician
František Masarovič (fl. 1930s), Slovak professional football player
František Maxmilián Kaňka (1674–1766), Czech architect
František Metelka (born 1980), Czech professional football player
František Mikloško (born 1947), Slovak politician
František Moravec (1895–1966), Czechoslovak military intelligence officer before and during World War II
František Mrázek (1958–2006), Czech entrepreneur and mobster; assassinated
František Nekolný (1907–1990), Czech Olympic boxer
František Neuwirt (1895–1957), Czech professor of stomatology
František Antonín Nickerl (1813–1871), Czech entomologist
František Nušl (1867–1951), Czech astronomer and mathematician
František Ondříček (1857–1922), Czech violinist and composer
František Palacký (1798–1876), Czech historian and politician
František Patočka (1904–1985), Czech microbiologist, serologist, and virologist
František Pecháček (1896–1944), Czech Olympic gymnast; died in a concentration camp during World War II
František Peřina (1911–2006), Czech fighter pilot ace during World War II with the French Armee de l'Air; also served with the RAF
František Pitra (born 1932), Czech politician; Prime Minister of the Czech Republic 1988–1990
František Plánička (1904–1996), Czech professional football player
František Pospíšil (born 1944), Czech professional ice hockey player and coach
František Procházka (born 1962), Czech ice hockey player
František Provazník (born 1948), Czech Olympic rower
František Raboň (born 1983), Czech professional bicycle road racer
František Rajtoral (born 1986), Czech professional football player
František Riha (born 1935), Czechoslovak Olympic sprint canoeist
František Rint (fl. 19th century), Czech woodcarver, carpenter, and sculptor of bones
František Roubík (1890–1974), Czech historian and archivist
František Šafránek (1931–1987), Czech professional football player
František Schmucker (born 1940), Czech professional football player
František Schneider (born 1987), Czech professional football player
František Schubert (1894–1940), Czech chess master
František Šebej (born 1947), Slovak politician and academic.
František Šimůnek (1910–unknown), Czech Olympic Nordic skier
František Skála (born 1956), Czech sculptor, painter, illustrator, musician, and dancer
František Škroup (1801–1862), Czech composer and conductor
František Sláma (disambiguation), multiple people
František Sláma (musician) (1923–2004), Czech chamber music cellist
František Šmahel (born 1934), Czech historian of medieval political and intellectual history
František Sokol (born 1939), Czech Olympic volleyball player
František Šolc (1920–1996), Czech French horn player and teacher
František Šorm (1913–1980), Czech chemist
František Štambachr (born 1953), Czech Olympic and professional football player
František Šťastný (1927–2000), Czech Grand Prix motorcycle road racer
František Šterc (1912–1978), Czech professional football player
František Straka (born 1958), Czech professional football player and manager
František Šulc (born 1950), Czech Olympic handball player
František Sušil (1804–1868), Moravian Roman Catholic priest and collector of traditional Moravian folk music
František Švantner (1912–1950), Slovak writer
František Švec (contemporary), Czechoslovak sprint canoeist
František Svoboda (1906–1948), Czech professional football player
František Svoboda (canoeist) (1904–unknown), Czechoslovak Olympic canoeist
František Tikal (1933–2008), Czech professional ice hockey player
František Tomášek (1899–1992), Czech cardinal of the Roman Catholic Church in Bohemia
František Treybal (1882–1947), Czech chess master
František Tůma (1704–1774), Czech composer of the Baroque period
František Udržal (1866–1938), Czechoslovak politician from Bohemia; Prime Minister of Czechoslovakia 1929–32
František Václav Míča (1694–1744), Czech composer and orchestra conductor
František Vaněček (1891–1945), Czech Olympic gymnast
František Velecký (1934–2003), Slovak actor
František Ventura (1894–1969), Czech Olympic horse jumper
František Veselý (1943–2009), Czech professional football player
František Vláčil (1924–1999), Czech film director, painter, and graphic artist
František Vladislav Hek (1769–1847), Czech writer and composer in early phases of the Czech National Revival
František Vršovský (born 1933), Czech Olympic sprint canoeist
František Vymazal (1841–1917), Czech polyglot and language textbook writer
František Vyskočil (born 1941), Czech professor of physiology and neurobiology
František Wende (1904–1968), Czech ski jumper and Nordic skier
František Xaver Dušek (1731–1799), Czech composer, harpsichordist, and pianist
František Zajíšek (born 1912), Czech Olympic bobsledder
František Záviška (1879–1945), Czech physicist
František Zdeněk Skuherský (1830–1892), Czech composer, pedagogue, and theoretician
František Ženíšek (1849–1916), Czech painter
František Zíta (1909–1977), Czech chess master
František Zvarík (1921–2008), Slovak theater and screen actor

Surname
Josef František (1914–1940), Czechoslovak fighter pilot and World War II flying ace

Czech masculine given names
Slovak masculine given names